Amorphoscelis naumanni is a species of praying mantis native to Afghanistan.

See also
List of mantis genera and species

References

Amorphoscelis
Fauna of Afghanistan
Insects described in 1983